Vallabhbhai Gobarbhai Kakadiya is a Member of Legislative assembly from Thakkarbapa Nagar constituency in Gujarat for its 12th, 13th, and 14th legislative assembly. He is a state-level minister of transport (independent charge).

Career
He was founder president of Ahmedabad Diamond Association (1987-2005). He was president of Ahmedabad Diamond Association Medical Trust. He has also served as the Trustee of following institutes:

 Saurashtra Patel Kelavani Mandal, Gulbai Tekra, Ambavadi, Ahmedabad
 Samast Patidar Samaj Surat.
 Patel Student Hostel Amreli
 Shree Hardasbapu Patel Seva Samaj (Patelvadi) Bapunagar, Ahmedabad
 Mahila Commerce College, Bapunagar

He has also served as:
Councilor of Gujaratchambers of commerce and industries.
Advisor board committee of the Kalupur CO. Op. Bank ltd
Managing Director of The Saurashtra Co.Op. Bank ltd. Bapunagar Ahmedabad

References

Living people
Bharatiya Janata Party politicians from Gujarat
Gujarat MLAs 2007–2012
Gujarat MLAs 2012–2017
1944 births
Gujarat MLAs 2017–2022